Introzzo is a comune (municipality) in the Province of Lecco in the Italian region Lombardy, located about  north of Milan and about  north of Lecco.  
Introzzo borders the following municipalities: Dervio, Dorio, Sueglio, Tremenico.

References

External links
 Official website

Cities and towns in Lombardy